This is a list of the National Register of Historic Places listings in Wise County, Texas.

This is intended to be a complete list of properties listed on the National Register of Historic Places in Wise County, Texas. There are five properties listed on the National Register in the county. Four properties are Recorded Texas Historic Landmarks including one that is also a State Antiquities Landmark.

Current listings

The locations of National Register properties may be seen in a mapping service provided.

|}

See also

National Register of Historic Places listings in Texas
Recorded Texas Historic Landmarks in Wise County

References

External links

Wise County, Texas
Wise County
Buildings and structures in Wise County, Texas